"The Loneliest" is a song by Italian rock band Måneskin, released on 7 October 2022 as the third single from their third studio album Rush! (2023). It debuted at number one in Italy.

Description 
The song was written by the band members with James Abrahart, Jason Evigan, Rami Yacoub and Sarah Hudson, with production by Fabrizio Ferraguzzo, during a recording session in Los Angeles, California. The frontman Damiano David talked about the meaning of the song:"The song is somewhere between a love letter and a will. I wrote it at a very difficult time in my life, when I was away from home and the people I love. The idea is: what would I want to say to these people if I were to die? It talks about feelings that everyone can relate to, and we would love to understand how different people understand the lyrics. We are happy that we were able to take some time to write a lot of new music. We chose to come out with this single because it shows a side of us that people haven't seen yet and we wanted to start our new journey from here."Guitarist Thomas Raggi defined the process of writing the music, saying that he "experimented a lot with the guitar and pedals and I used Igmo, which allowed me to write creatively and give it color," while drummer Ethan Torchio called the production process of "The Loneliest" restorative for the band.

Promotion 
On 21 September 2022, Måneskin posted on their social media accounts a video featuring a letter with cursive writing, with the focus on two words: "The Loneliest". Along with the video, the band had announced that a new single from the band was set to be released in October. Two days later, the band officially announced the title of the song.

Critical reception 

Italian critic Mattia Marzi of Rockol wrote that "The Loneliest" sounds "hyperclassical" like a "ballad from another time" in terms of sound and narrative structure, finding the lyrics of a "disarming simplicity"; Marzi ended the review by comparing the song with the single "Supermodel", stating that "compared to the California sound and modern rock groove of 'Supermodel', here Maneskin dredges up the airy, orchestral atmospheres of ballads like 'Torna a casa'; [. ...] major pieces of their Italian journey."

Gianni Poglio of Panorama described the song's strengths, finding them in the singer's "focused and effective" performance, production and musicianship, and the guitar solo, defined as "original and melodically flawless." Gabriele Scorsonelli of Il Fatto Quotidiano associated the song with Guns N' Roses' "November Rain", although he noted that "Thomas's guitar solo evokes, in a reference that definitely does not pretend to become a comparison" with the U.S. group, finding it a gesture of "admiration for the historic group."

Music video 
The music video for the song, filmed in the Villa Tittoni Traversi in Desio and directed by Tommaso Ottomano, was released on 13 October 2022.

Vogue Italia's Giacomo Aricò wrote that the video has "a strong dark component from the cinematic references typical of the Gothic style," dwelling on the sequence defined as "symbolic" where "the frontman experiences a splitting between his subconscious (where we see him drowning) and reality (where he vomits water at the funeral)." Alessandra De Tommasi for Vanity Fair Italia found that "this almost Burtonian dark-tinged narrative amplifies the power of the song itself" finding the direction "splendid."

Commercial success 
"The Loneliest" debuted at the top of Spotify's global weekend chart after totaling more than 4 million plays. After one week, the song debuted at number 53 on the same platform's weekly global chart, marking the highest new entry with 9.5 million streams.

In Italy, the song debuted at number one on the FIMI Top Singles Chart, becoming the band's second single to achieve the feat.

Charts

Weekly charts

Year-end charts

Certifications

References 

2022 songs
2022 singles
Måneskin songs
Number-one singles in Italy
Rock ballads
Ultratop 50 Singles (Wallonia) number-one singles
Songs written by Rami Yacoub